Devil's Playground may refer to:

Films
 The Devil's Playground (1917 film), an American drama film directed by Harry McRae Webster
 The Devil's Playground (1928 film), an Australian silent drama film directed by Victor A. Bindley
 The Devil's Playground (1937 film), an American drama directed by Erle C. Kenton 
 The Devil's Playground (1946 film), a drama starring William Boyd as Hop-Along Cassidy
 The Devil's Playground (1976 film), an Australian  semi-autobiography by Fred Schepisi
 Devil's Playground (2002 film), a documentary by Lucy Walker about the Amish period called Rumspringa
 Devil's Playground (2010 film), a British horror film directed by Marc McQueen

Other
 Devil's Playground (TV series), a 2014 TV series, which is a sequel to the 1976 Australian film
 Devil's Playground (album), a 2005 album by Billy Idol
 "Devil's Playground", a song from The Flower Kings' 2002 album Unfold the Future
 Da Devil’s Playground: Underground Solo a 1999 album by Koopsta Knicca
 The Devil's Playground, 2004 novel by Stav Sherez
 Devils Playground, an area within the Mojave Desert 
 A flat, nearly straight section of the Pikes Peak Highway, above treeline, that is a lightning hotspot.
 Devil's Playground (song), a 1990 song by Glenn Danzig from the album Danzig II: Lucifuge
 Judge Dredd: Crime Chronicles - The Devil's Playground, an audio play by Big Finish Productions